Eckart is a German surname, and may refer to:

 Anselm Eckart (1721–1809), German Jesuit missionary
 Carl Eckart
 Dennis E. Eckart (born 1950), American lawyer, former member of the U.S. House of Representatives
 Dietrich Eckart (1868–1923), German journalist, poet and one of the founders of the Deutsche Arbeiterparte
 Gabriele Eckart (born 1954), German philosopher and author
 Malcolm Eckart, an American race car driver who drove Hudson cars in the Carrera Panamericana race in the 1950s.
 Max-Eckart Wolff (1902–1988), German naval commander in the Kriegsmarine of Nazi Germany during World War II.
 William Eckart Lehman (1821–1895), Democratic member of the U.S. House of Representatives from Pennsylvania
 William and Jean Eckart, a husband-and-wife team of theatre designers in the 1950s and 1960s

 Given name
 Eckart Afheldt (1921–1999), German general in the Bundeswehr
 Eckart Berkes (1949–2014), German hurdler 
 Eckart Breitschuh (born 1964), German comic-book artist and author
 Eckart Diesch, German sailor
 Eckart Dux (born 1926), German voice actor, film and television actor
 Eckart Höfling (1936–2014), German Catholic priest who worked combating poverty in Brazil
 Eckart Kehr (1902-1933), Marxist German historian
 Eckart Marsch (born 1947), German theoretical physicist
 Eckart Märzke (born 1952), former East German football player and currently manager
 Eckart Preu (born 1969), East German-born conductor
 Eckart Ratz (born 1953), Austrian President of the Supreme Court of Justice
 Eckart Schütrumpf (born 1939), American classicist and academician
 Eckart Suhl (born 1943), former field hockey player from Germany
 Eckart Viehweg (1948-2010), German mathematician
 Eckart von Bonin (1911-1943), German Second World War fighter ace 
 Eckart von Hirschhausen (born 1967), German physician, comedian and talk show host
 Eckart von Klaeden (born 1965), German politician of the Christian Democratic Union
 Eckart Wagner (1938–2002), German sailor
 Eckart Witzigmann, Austrian chef

See also
 Eckhart (disambiguation)

br:Ekkehard
nds:Eggert
pl:Ekhard